A larum is an alarm signal "to arms!" from Old Italian all'arme

A Larum for London or The Siege of Antwerp, play 1602
A Larum (album)

See also
Mater Larum Mother of the Lares